Villiers-le-Bel – Gonesse – Arnouville is a railway station in Arnouville, Essonne, Île-de-France, France. The station was opened in 1859 and is on the Paris–Lille railway. The station is served by the RER Line D, which is operated by SNCF. The station serves the communes of Arnouville, to the north Villiers-le-Bel and, to the east, Gonesse.

History
The line from Saint-Denis station to Creil via Survilliers - Fosses was opened in 1859 by the Chemins de fer du Nord after six years of studies, with two tracks built at the station. That number was then doubled in 1907. A fifth track was laid during the construction of the LGV Nord in the early 1990s between Pierrefitte station and the new Gonesse junction.

Station info
Situated at an altitude at 69 meters above sea level, the station is on the 14.759 kilometer point of the Paris-Lille railway, between the stations of Garges–Sarcelles and Goussainville. The station served 12,001,779 people in 2019, and 9,347,400 people in 2014.

Train services
The following services serve the station:

Local services (RER D) Goussainville – Villiers-le-Bel – Gare du Nord – Gare de Lyon – Combs-la-Ville–Quincy – Melun
Local services (RER D) Creil – Orry-la-Ville–Coye – Villiers-le-Bel – Gare du Nord – Gare de Lyon – Juvisy – Évry-Courcouronnes – Corbeil-Essonnes

Tramway of Villiers-le-Bel
From 1878 to 1949, a tram line, the Villiers-le-Bel tramway, linked the station to the village of Villiers-le-Bel. As the commune center of Villiers-le-Bel was not quite that easily accessible to the station, the tramway started between the two places. Due to the growing amount of competitors (private cars, and other buses were more efficient), the tramway closed down in 1949.

References

External links

 
 

Réseau Express Régional stations
Railway stations in France opened in 1859